Spain competed at the 2022 World Aquatics Championships in Budapest, Hungary from 18 June to 3 July.

Medalists

Artistic swimming 

Spain entered 12 artistic swimmers.

Women

Mixed

Diving

Spain entered 3 divers.

Men

Open water swimming

Spain entered 4 open water swimmers (2 male and 2 female )

Men

Women

Mixed

Swimming

Spain entered 8 swimmers.
Men

Women

Water polo

Summary

Men's tournament

Team roster

Group play

Quarterfinal

Semifinal

Final

Women's tournament

Team roster

Group play

Playoffs

Quarterfinals

5th–8tth place semifinal

Fifth place game

References

Nations at the 2022 World Aquatics Championships
2022
World Aquatics Championships